Bernardo Francisco da Silva, known as Chico Gordo (2 October 1949 – 22 November 2000) was an Angolan football player. He also held Portuguese citizenship.

He played 11 seasons and 230 games in the Primeira Liga, mostly for Braga and also for Porto, Tirsense and Vitória de Setúbal.

Club career
He made his professional debut in the Primeira Liga for Porto on 15 September 1968 in a 1–3 loss to Vitória de Setúbal.

References

1949 births
People from Benguela Province
Portuguese sportspeople of Angolan descent
Angolan emigrants to Portugal
Angolan footballers
FC Porto players
Primeira Liga players
F.C. Tirsense players
S.C. Braga players
Vitória F.C. players
S.C. Beira-Mar players
2000 deaths
Association football forwards